The Ariarathid  dynasty was a hereditary dynasty of Iranian origin.

Kings of Cappadocia

 Ariarathes I 331 – 322 BC
 Ariarathes II 301 – 280 BC
 Ariaramnes 280 – 230 BC
 Ariarathes III 255 – 220 BC
 Ariarathes IV 220 – 163 BC
 Ariarathes V 163 – 130 BC
 Ariarathes VI 130 – 116 BC
 Ariarathes VII 116 – 101 BC
 Ariarathes VIII 101 – 96 BC
 Ariarathes IX 101 – 96 BC

References

Sources 
 
 
 
 
 
 

 
Iranian dynasties
Kings of Cappadocia